Mrs. America Pageant is a beauty competition that was established to honor married women throughout the United States of America. Each of the contestants representing the 50 states and the District of Columbia ranges in age from their 20s to 50s and earns the right to participate in the national event by winning her state competition. These state events are under the direction of Mrs. America state directors.  The winner goes on to compete in the Mrs. World pageant.

Mrs. America, Inc., will celebrate its 45th anniversary in 2021.  The pageant has been televised on networks including PAX and WE (Women's Entertainment); in May 2011, it was carried by the My Family TV network.

On August 29, 2014, the pageant was held in Loews Ventana Canyon Resort in Tucson, Arizona. The pageant moved to its original pageant home, Las Vegas - Westgate Resort, Hotel and Casino. The pageant continues to be held in Las Vegas yearly.

During the 2014 pageant, Mrs. America, Inc., announced that it would be participating in a joint Russian-American contest to be held in Sevastopol, Crimea. This has caused some controversy, since Crimea is recognized by most countries in the world as Ukrainian territory that has been annexed by Russia. The 2015 joint pageant was supposed to mark the 25th anniversary of a joint U.S.-Soviet Mrs. America contest held in Moscow in 1989 to foster good will between the two countries; however, organizers announced that due to the devaluation of the ruble against the American dollar, the pageant would have to find a new site.

The Mrs. America 2023 Pageant was held on August 20, 2022 in Las Vegas, Nevada. Nicole Zwiercan of Illinois was crowned Mrs. America.

Events
1955: Ramona Deitemeyer, Mrs. America 1955, appeared on What's My Line?.

1993: Verna Martin,  Mrs. District of Columbia, on Wednesday, May 12, 1993 the designation of Mrs. Washington, DC – America 1993 was conferred upon Verna Martin by the Mrs. America Pageant selection committee.

She is the first African American contestant to win her state title.

2004: Traci Clemens, Mrs. Rhode Island, competed while six months pregnant with twins.  She was the first visibly pregnant woman to compete in the nationally televised event.  Traci Clemens is also the first African American contestant to win her state title.  Traci has made double pageant history.

Titleholders
Titleholders are designated by year of title/reign; competitions are held the preceding fall.

Crossovers
Some contestants in the Mrs. America pageant have previously held state pageant titles in the Miss USA, Miss America, Mrs. United States, and Miss Teen USA pageants. They include:
Mrs. Delaware 1985 - Debi Teed Fenimore (née Dow) - Miss Delaware National Teenager 1972
Mrs. Hawaii 1991- Julie Larson-Taylor- Miss Hawaii USA 1989 and Miss Utah US Teen 1985
Mrs. North Carolina 1997 - Janice McQueen Ward - Mrs. United States 1999
Mrs. Indiana 2000 & Mrs. America 2001 - Nicole (Llewellyn) Brink - Miss Indiana Teen USA 1992 & Miss Indiana USA 1998
Mrs. South Carolina 2013-Jennifer Loveday-Donovan-Mrs South Carolina United States 2010 (Top 15 at Mrs United States)-Miss South Carolina United States 2004 (1st Runner-up Miss United States)-Miss South Carolina Teen United States 1999
Mrs. Virginia 2001 & Mrs. America 2002 - Laurett Ellsworth Arenz - Mrs. Virginia United States & Mrs. United States 1997
Mrs. Pennsylvania 2001 - Dr. Lori Sundberg - Mrs. Pennsylvania International 1999, Mrs. Pennsylvania United States 2000 & Mrs. District of Columbia United States 2014
Mrs. Colorado 2002  - Emily (Weeks) Stark - Miss Colorado USA 1995
Mrs. Arizona 2004 - Britt (Powell) Boyse - Miss Missouri USA 1995 - Top 12 Miss USA 1995
Mrs. Idaho 2004 - Amanda (Greenway) Peterson - Miss Idaho Teen USA 1992
Mrs. Iowa 2004 - Jamie (Solinger) Patterson - Miss Iowa Teen USA 1992 - Miss Teen USA 1992, & Miss Iowa USA 1998
Mrs. Kansas 2004 - Kimberlee (Girrens) Easter - Miss Kansas Teen USA 1986 & Miss Kansas USA 1992
Mrs. Maryland 2004 - Nikki Karl - Mrs. Maryland International 2003
Mrs. Massachusetts 2004 - Claire (DeSimone) O'Connor - Miss Rhode Island USA 1999
Mrs. Minnesota 2004 - Melissa (Hall) Young - Miss Minnesota USA 1997
Mrs. New Hampshire 2004 - Stephanie (Foisy) Mills - Miss New Hampshire 1995
Mrs. Texas 2004 - Jennifer (Craig) Palmieri - Miss Georgia USA 1996
Mrs. West Virginia 2004 - Amanda (Burns) Duffy - Miss West Virginia Teen USA 1997 & Miss West Virginia USA 1999
Mrs. Pennsylvania 2005 - Kandace Gary - Mrs. Pennsylvania United States 2002
Mrs. South Carolina 2005 - Angela Hughes-Singleton - Miss South Carolina 1996
Mrs. California 2005 & Mrs. America 2006 - Andrea (Ballengee) Preuss - Miss Virginia Teen USA 1992 - Miss Virginia 1995 (dethroned) - Mrs. United States 2003
Mrs. Maine 2006 - Heather (Coutts) Clark - Miss Maine USA 1999
Mrs. Minnesota 2006 - Holly (Henderson) Ernst - Mrs. Minnesota International 2003, Mrs. Minnesota United States 2009/2002, Miss Wisconsin World America 1993, Miss Wisconsin U.S. Teen 1990 - Miss Junior Wisconsin 1989
Mrs. New Hampshire 2006 - Jessica Plante - Mrs. Massachusetts International 2008
Mrs. Florida 2007 - Jamie Converse-Estrada - Miss Florida USA 1998
Mrs. Illinois 2007 - Hallie (Bonnell) Thompson - Miss Ohio USA 1987
Mrs. Maryland 2007 - Adrienne Watson Carver - Mrs. Maryland United States 2006
Mrs. North Carolina 2007 - Kathryn Hancock-Stuart - Miss South Carolina Teen USA 1990
Mrs. Oregon 2007 - Kimberly (Stubblefield) Takla - Miss Oregon USA 1986
Mrs. Pennsylvania 2007 - Allison Dalcamo - Mrs. Pennsylvania United States 2005
Mrs. Tennessee 2007 - Christina (Lam) Ryan - Miss Illinois USA 1999
Mrs. Utah 2007 - Heather (Henderson) Osmond - Miss Utah Teen USA 1994
Mrs. Florida 2008 - Jaclyn (Nesheiwat) Stapp - Miss New York USA 2004
Mrs. Michigan 2008 - Sara Dusendang-Moylan - Miss Michigan Teen USA 1999
Mrs. Connecticut 2009 - Melanie (Mudry) Varian - Miss Connecticut USA 2007
Mrs. District of Columbia 2009 - Deanna McCray James - Mrs. Maryland United States 2005
Mrs. Massachusetts 2009 - Rosalie Allain-Morris - Miss Massachusetts USA 2000
Mrs. Missouri 2009 & Mrs. America 2010 - Andrea Robertson (Mrs. Missouri United States 2002)
Mrs. Pennsylvania 2009 - Joyelle Scavone - Mrs. Pennsylvania United States 2006
Mrs. Vermont 2009 - Jennifer (Ripley) Bisson - Miss Vermont Teen USA 1999 & Miss Vermont USA 2003
Mrs. Arizona 2010 - Corrie (Hill) Francis - Miss Arizona 2003
Mrs. Colorado 2010 - Shalon (Pecosky) Polson - Miss Colorado Teen USA 1990
Mrs. District of Columbia 2010 - Regena Robinson - Mrs. Maryland United States 2008
Mrs. Florida 2010 - Kellie Lightbourn - Miss Virginia USA 1999
Mrs. Hawaii 2010 - Alicia Michioka-Jones - Miss Hawaii USA 2003 - Top 10 Miss USA 2003
Mrs. Michigan 2010 - Stephanie Hunt - Miss United Teenager 1982 - Mrs. United States 2007
Mrs. New York 2010 - Meaghan (Jarensky) Castaldi - Miss New York USA 2005 - Top 10 Miss USA 2005
Mrs. Texas 2010 - Shannon (Schambeau) Patterson - Miss District of Columbia 2005 - 4th Runner Up Miss America 2005
Mrs. Ohio 2011 - Melanie (Murphy) Miller - Miss Ohio 2006
Mrs. Alaska 2012 - Vicki Sarber - Miss Alaska American Coed 1992 - 2nd Runner Up Miss American Coed 1992 - Miss Alaska Teen of the Year 1990 - 1st Runner Up Miss Teen of the Year 1990
Mrs. Pennsylvania 2012 - Susan Huntley - Mrs. Pennsylvania United States 2010, Mrs. Pennsylvania International 2008
Mrs. Texas 2013 - Austen (Brown) Williams - Miss South Carolina Teen USA 2002 - Miss Congeniality Miss Teen USA 2002
Mrs. Delaware 2013 - Christine Rich - Mrs. Delaware United States 2015 - Top 15 Mrs. United States 2015, Mrs. USA Earth 2022
Mrs. Illinois 2013 - Stephanie (Daughenbaugh) Piller - Ms. Galaxy International 2010
Mrs. Illinois 2014/Mrs. Illinois 2018 & Mrs. America 2019 - Nicole (Rash) Cook - Miss Indiana 2007 - 1st Runner Up Miss America 2008
Mrs. Massachusetts 2014- Monique (Jones) Taylor- Miss Massachusetts Teen USA 2000- Ms. Massachusetts United States 2012- 1st Runner Up Ms. United States 2012
Mrs. Alabama 2015 - Madeilne (Mitchell) Gwin - Miss Alabama USA 2011 - 2nd Runner Up Miss USA 2011
Mrs. Colorado 2015 - Mette (Boving) Castor - Miss Louisiana 1997 - Top 10 Miss America 1998 
Mrs. Iowa 2015 - Jessica (Lawrence) Gardner - Miss South Dakota USA 2003 
Mrs. Maryland 2015 - Su Joing (Drakeford) Sollers - Miss Nebraska USA 2001
Mrs. New Jersey 2015 - Erin (Abrahamson) Molinaro - Miss New Jersey USA 2007 - Miss New Jersey Teen USA 2001
Mrs. Pennsylvania 2015 - Kate Schartel Novak - Mrs. Pennsylvania United States 2011 - Mrs. Pennsylvania International 2019
Mrs. Texas 2015 - Melissa Pocza - Mrs. Texas America 2009 - Mrs. Texas United States 2011 - 3rd Runner Up Mrs. United States 2011 - Mrs. Michigan International - Mrs. International 2017
Mrs. Idaho 2016 -  Christi (Weible) van Ravenhorst - Miss Idaho 2001
Mrs. Georgia 2016 - Onica (Williams) Blaize - Miss Guyana USA 1995
Mrs. Montana 2016 - Casey McLain Proban - Miss California Teen USA USA 2001 - Top 10 Miss Teen USA 2001
Mrs. Indiana 2017 - Mekayla (Diehl) Eppers - [Top 12 at Mrs. World]Miss Indiana USA 2014 - Top 20 Miss USA 2014
Mrs. Idaho 2018 - Kimberly (Weible) Zweiger - Miss Idaho USA 2004 - Top 10 Miss USA 2004
Mrs. South Carolina 2018 - Anna (Hanks) Hewitt - Miss South Carolina USA 2003 - Top 10 Miss USA 2003

Forerunner pageant
Prior to the current Mrs. America pageant, there was an earlier pageant of the same name.  The pageant was created by public relations executive Bert Nevins in 1936 as a promotion for his client, Palisades Amusement Park in New Jersey. When Nevins sold the pageant in 1963, it was the only nationally televised beauty pageant for married women.

By 1964, participants were graded on cooking, sewing, ironing, party preparation and other homemaking abilities, family psychology, grooming, poise, personality, and general attractiveness. Winners included:
Source: online newspaper archives
1938: Margaret Chamberlain, Ohio (appeared on Family Feud in 1980)
1939: Theresa Papp, New Jersey 
1940: Evelyn Schmitt, New Jersey	 		
1941: Ruth Licklider, New York
1942: Peggie Diehl, Minnesota?	
1943–46: no pageant (World War II)		
1947: Janice Pollock, Ohio; then Fredda Acker, South Carolina (after Pollock abdicated)
1948: Maria Strohmeier, Pennsylvania
1949: Frances Cloyd, California
1950: Betty McAllister, Pennsylvania
1951:	
1952: Penny Duncan, New York; Peggy Creel, Florida (judges' contest winner, Creel was the winner; but Duncan was announced)
1953: Evelyn Joyce Schenk, New Jersey 
1954: Erna Snyder, Pennsylvania
1955: Wanda Jennings, Missouri 
1956: Ramona Deitemeyer, Nebraska (appeared on What's My Line May 22, 1955)
1957:	Cleo Maletis, Oregon
1958: Lynwood Finley, District of Columbia
1959: Helen Giesse, Ohio
1960: Margaret Priebe, Iowa
1961: Mrs. Rosemary Murphy, Indiana
1962: Lila Masson, Michigan		
1963: Marilyn Mitchell, California
1964: Deseree Jenkins, South Carolina
1965: Alice Buehner, Utah
1966: Joy Noufer, Texas
1967: Marlene Cochran, Kansas
1968: Joan Fisher, Utah
1969:

Hosts
Chet Buchannan
Barbara Chase
Bobby Van
Richard Dawson
Florence Henderson
Christopher Knight
Alan Thicke

References

External links

Beauty pageants in the United States
1977 establishments in the United States
American awards
America (contest)